Harttia uatumensis is a species of armored catfish endemic to Brazil, where it is found in the Uatumã River basin. This species grows to a length of  SL.

References 
 

uatumensis
Catfish of South America
Fish of Brazil
Endemic fauna of Brazil
Taxa named by Lúcia Helena Rapp Py-Daniel
Taxa named by Edinbergh Caldas de Oliveira
Fish described in 2001